Tilutl is a rural locality (a selo) in Tlyaratinsky Selsoviet, Tlyaratinsky District, Republic of Dagestan, Russia. The population was 347 as of 2010.

Geography 
Tilutl is located 2 km northwest of Tlyarata (the district's administrative centre) by road. Tlyarata is the nearest rural locality.

References 

Rural localities in Tlyaratinsky District